The 1st Los Angeles Film Critics Association Awards, given by the Los Angeles Film Critics Association (LAFCA), honored the best in film for 1975.

Winners
Best Picture (tie):
Dog Day Afternoon
One Flew Over the Cuckoo's Nest
Best Director:
Sidney Lumet – Dog Day Afternoon
Best Actor:
Al Pacino – Dog Day Afternoon
Best Actress:
Florinda Bolkan – A Brief Vacation (Una breve vacanza)
Best Screenplay:
Joan Tewkesbury – Nashville
Best Cinematography:
John Alcott – Barry Lyndon
Best Foreign Film:
And Now My Love (Toute une vie) • France/Italy
Special Citation:
Love Among the Ruins

References

External links
1st Annual Los Angeles Film Critics Association Awards

1975
1975 film awards
1975 in American cinema